MBC Life (formerly known as Alice TV) was a South Korean non-'free-to-air' television network, which aired programming documentary for life cultures.

Contents 
This is one of the Korean cable television channels that specialize in broadcasting documentary-related life cultures. Was a subsidiary of the MBC Plus Media.

Munhwa Broadcasting Corporation television networks
Television channels in South Korea
Korean-language television stations
Television channels and stations established in 2005